DZRR (pronounced as DZ-double-R; 103.1 FM), broadcasting as MOR 103.1 For Life!, was a radio station owned and operated by the ABS-CBN Corporation. Its studio was located at the ABS-CBN Broadcast Center, #59 First Road, Quezon Hill Proper, Baguio. Its transmitter was located atop Mt. Sto. Tomas, Tuba, Benguet.

History
DZRR was first launched on August 1, 1989, as "Radio Romance" making ABS-CBN's first FM station outside Metro Manila, simulcasting its Manila feed.

On May 5, 2020, the station, along with the other My Only Radio stations, went off the air due to the cease and desist order of the National Telecommunications Commission following the ABS-CBN franchise renewal controversy. It currently operates as an online platform.

References

External links

Radio stations in Baguio
MOR Philippines stations
Radio stations established in 1989
Radio stations disestablished in 2020
Defunct radio stations in the Philippines